Siah Darvishan (also Romanized as Sīāh Darvīshān; also known as Siyakh-Darveshan) is a village in Hend Khaleh Rural District, Tulem District, Sowme'eh Sara County, Gilan Province, Iran. At the 2006 census, its population was 956, in 272 families.

References 

Populated places in Sowme'eh Sara County